Hakim Ali ibn Kamal al-Din Muhammad Gilani was a 16th-century Gilak royal physician from Gilan, Iran. 

He came from Persia to the Mughal court of Akbar and served under several Mughal rulers in northwest India. He is particularly known for his commentary on The Canon of Medicine by Avicenna. 

Hakim Ali Gilani died on 14 Dhu al-Hijjah 1017AH, or 22 March 1609.

Sources
For evidence regarding his life, see:

Carl Brockelmann, Geschichte der arabischen Litteratur, Supplement, 3 vols. (Leiden: Brill, 1937–1942)., vol. 2, p. 626.
A. Z. Iskandar, A Catalogue of Arabic Manuscripts on Medicine and Science in the Wellcome Historical Medical Library (London: The Wellcome Historical Medical Library, 1967), p. 182.

See also
List of Iranian scientists

16th-century Iranian physicians
1609 deaths
People from Gilan Province
Year of birth unknown
17th-century Iranian physicians